The Styrian dialect group (štajerska narečna skupina, štajerščina) is a group of closely related dialects of Slovene. The Lower Carniolan dialects are spoken in central and eastern Slovenian Styria and in the Lower Sava Valley and Central Sava Valley.

Phonological and morphological characteristics
Among other features, this group is characterized by loss of pitch accent, tonemically high and lengthened accented syllables, lengthening of accented short syllables, and frequent development of a > ɔ, and u > ü in the eastern part of the territory.

Individual dialects and subdialects
 Central Savinja dialect (srednjesavinjsko narečje, srednja savinjščina)
 Upper Savinja dialect (zgornjesavinjsko narečje, zgornja savinjščina)
 Solčava subdialect (solčavski govor)
 Central Styrian dialect (srednještajersko narečje, osrednja štajerščina)
 South Pohorje dialect (južnopohorsko narečje, štajerska pohorščina)
 Kozjak subdialect (kozjaški govor)
 Kozje-Bizeljsko dialect (kozjansko-bizeljsko narečje)
 Lower Sava Valley dialect (posavsko narečje, posavščina)
 Zagorje-Trbovlje subdialect (zagorsko-trboveljski govor)
 Laško subdialect (laški govor)
 Sevnica-Krško subdialect (sevniško-krški govor)

References

Slovene dialects in Styria (Slovenia)